Landmoth-cum-Catto is a civil parish in the Hambleton district of North Yorkshire, England. The parish has two Grade II listed buildings – Marigold Hall and Catto Hall.

References

Civil parishes in North Yorkshire